

First round selections

The following are the first round picks in the 1984 Major League Baseball draft.

Other notable players 
Jeff Blauser†, 1st round (secondary phase), 4th overall by the Atlanta Braves
Greg Maddux‡, 2nd round, 31st overall by the Chicago Cubs
John Farrell, 2nd round, 32nd overall by the Cleveland Indians
Tom Glavine‡, 2nd round, 47th overall by the Atlanta Braves
Marvin Freeman, 2nd round, 49th overall by the Philadelphia Phillies
Al Leiter†, 2nd round, 50th overall by the New York Yankees
Ken Caminiti†, 3rd round, 71st overall by the Houston Astros
Greg Myers, 3rd round, 74th overall by the Toronto Blue Jays
Dwight Smith, 3rd round (secondary phase), 62nd overall by the Chicago Cubs
Mike Henneman†, 4th round, 104th overall by the Detroit Tigers
Jamie Moyer†, 6th round, 135th overall by the Chicago Cubs
Lance Johnson†, 6th round, 139th overall by the St. Louis Cardinals
Todd Burns, 7th round, 168th overall by the Oakland Athletics
Jody Reed, 8th round, 198th overall by the Boston Red Sox
John Vander Wal, 8th round, 201st overall by the Houston Astros, but did not sign
Rich Rodriguez, 9th round, 211th overall by the New York Mets
John Wetteland†, 12th round, 289th overall by the New York Mets, but did not sign
Jeff Brantley†, 13th round, 327th overall by the Montreal Expos, but did not sign
John Jaha†, 14th round, 358th overall by the Milwaukee Brewers
Chuck Finley†, 15th round, 372nd overall by the California Angels, but did not sign
Darren Holmes, 16th round, 415th overall by the Los Angeles Dodgers
Dante Bichette†, 17th round, 424th overall by the California Angels
Gene Larkin, 20th round, 504th overall by the Minnesota Twins
Jack McDowell†, 20th round, 510th overall by the Boston Red Sox, but did not sign
Jeff Fassero, 22nd round, 554th overall by the St. Louis Cardinals
Jeff Nelson†, 22nd round, 569th overall by the Los Angeles Dodgers
Mike Devereaux, 26th round, 644th overall by the Cleveland Indians, but did not sign
Don Wakamatsu, 51st round, 839th overall by the New York Yankees, but did not sign

† All-Star  
‡ Hall of Famer

NFL/CFL players drafted
Damon Allen, 7th round, 182nd overall by the Detroit Tigers, but did not sign
Mike Prior, 18th round, 469th overall by the Baltimore Orioles, but did not sign
Rodney Peete, 30th round, 722nd overall by the Toronto Blue Jays, but did not sign

References

External links 
Complete draft list from The Baseball Cube database

Major League Baseball draft
Draft
Major League Baseball draft
Major League Baseball draft
Baseball in New York City
Sporting events in New York City
Madison Square Garden
Sports in Manhattan
1980s in Manhattan